Enargia is a genus of moths of the family Noctuidae.

Species
 Enargia abluta Hübner, 1808
 Enargia fausta Schmidt, 2010
 Enargia flavata Wileman & West
 Enargia contecta Graeser, 1892
 Enargia fuliginosa Draudt, 1950
 Enargia infumata (Grote, 1874)
 Enargia kansuensis Draudt, 1935
 Enargia paleacea Esper, 1788
 Enargia pinkeri de Freina & Hacker, 1985
 Enargia staudingeri Alphéraky, 1882
 Enargia jordani Rothschild, 1920
 Enargia decolor Walker, 1858

References
 Natural History Museum Lepidoptera genus database
 Enargia at funet

Caradrinini